Manocalzati is a town and comune in the province of Avellino, Campania, Southern Italy. The area produces chestnuts, nuts and grapes.

History
Traces from the Iron Age indicate this town existed in the 8th century BC.

Manocalzati was later a fiefdom of the San Barbato family.

Main sights
The town retains its original medieval appearance, with narrow streets and palaces with decorated portals from the 18th and 19th centuries. There are two churches from the 18th century: Saint Michael (belltower built in the 16th century) and Saint Anna.

Within Manocalzati is San Barbato, a small hamlet overlooking the Serinese valley. Its medieval architecture is composed of houses surrounding a medieval castle.

References

External links
Official website
San Barbato Castle

Cities and towns in Campania